No. 45 Squadron Indian Air Force (Flying Daggers) is a Fighter Squadron internally based at Sulur AFS, Tamil Nadu. The squadron operates the indigenous HAL Tejas fighter from 1 July 2016. The squadron was initially based at Bangalore, Karnataka and later shifted to its main base in Sulur from 1 June 2018.

History
The squadron was raised on 15 February 1957, with de Havilland Vampires, as a Ground-Attack and Close Air Support unit. Later The Vampires were replaced by MiG-21Bison. The MiGs which were operated from Naliya were withdrawn from squadron service in 2002. It is the first operational squadron of the indigenous fighter jet HAL Tejas. The squadron operated from HAL Airport, Bangalore for nearly two years before it moved to its designated locations at Sulur near Coimbatore. It is also the first fighter squadron to be part of the Southern Air Command of IAF headquarters at Thiruvananthapuram. Group Captain Madhav Rangachari is the first commanding officer and Sqn Ldr Devdeep Ghosh is the first squadron doctor of the Tejas squadron.

Indo-Pakistan War of 1965

On 1 September 1965, during the Indo-Pakistani War, No. 45 Squadron IAF responded to a request for strikes against a counter-attack by the Pakistan Army (Operation Grand Slam), and twelve Vampire Mk 52 fighter-bombers were successful in slowing the Pakistani advance. However, the Vampires encountered two PAF F-86 Sabres, in the ensuing dogfight, the outdated Vampires were outclassed. One was shot down by ground fire and another three were shot down by Sabres. The Vampires were withdrawn from front line service after these losses.

Atlantique incident
Indian Air Force No.45 Squadron was involved in the Atlantique incident on 10 August 1999. Two MiG-21 Bison from No.45 Squadron IAF intercepted and shot down a Pakistan Air Force naval reconnaissance plane.

Assignments
Indo-Pakistani War of 1965
Atlantique incident

Aircraft

Aircraft types operated by the squadron

The squadron has 16 Tejas aircraft in currently in service.

Gallery

References

45